MFD may refer to:

Fire departments
 Madison Fire Department, US
 Minneapolis Fire Department, US
 Milwaukee Fire Department, US
 Mumbai Fire Brigade, India

Science, technology, and medicine
 Macroscopic Fundamental Diagram, a type of fundamental diagram of traffic flow in transportation engineering
 Medium-density fibreboard
 Microfarad, a unit of electrical capacitance sometimes written as "MFD"
 Minimum focus distance, in macro photography
 Mode field diameter, an expression of distribution of the irradiance, across the end face of a single-mode fiber
 Modular function deployment, a method for product modularization

 Multifunction display, an interactive system for presenting various information
 Mutation Frequency Decline, a gene/gene product used in transcription-coupled repair

Computing
 Multifunction device, an office all-in-one device (copier, printer, scanner)
 Micro Floppy Disk, the 3½-inch floppy disk format; See History of the floppy disk
 Mini Floppy Disk, the 5¼-inch floppy disk format; See History of the floppy disk

Hiring
 m/f/d, an initialism welcoming "male, female and disabled (or diverse)" candidates.

Transportation
Mansfield Lahm Regional Airport (IATA airport code)
Minoan Flying Dolphins, a Greek ferry company

See also
 Mladá fronta DNES (MF DNES), a daily newspaper in the Czech Republic